Mayakovo is a village in Strugo-Krasnensky District of Pskov Oblast, Russia, located on the bank of Sitnya River, northeast of the town Pskov. Population: 

Rural localities in Pskov Oblast